Below a list of Scheduled Caste communities and their population according to  Scheduled Castes and Scheduled Tribes Order (Amendment Act) 1976 and as amended by the Constitution (Scheduled castes) Orders (Second Amendment) Act, 2002 (Act 61 of 2002) vide Part VIII- Kerala- Schedule I notified in the Gazette of India, dated 18 December 2002) and (As amended by the Scheduled Castes and Scheduled Tribes Orders (Amendment) Act 2002 (Act 10 of 2003) vide Part VII- Kerala- Second Schedule notified in the Gazette of India dated 8 January 2003 in Kerala.

References 

Scheduled Castes
Scheduled Castes
Delhi